LeClaire Gowans Alger (May 20, 1898 – November 14, 1969) was an American writer better known under her pseudonym Sorche Nic Leodhas, or simply Sorche Leodhas. Born in Youngstown, Ohio, she was a sickly child, eventually being homeschooled. Alger was a known librarian, working from 1915 to 1966, while the imaginary Sorche was a storyteller. She sought out traditional Scottish tales that had never been written down before. She won a  Lewis Carroll Shelf Award in 1962 and a Newbery Honor for Thistle and Thyme: Tales and Legends from Scotland in 1963. Her 1965 children's picture book Always Room for One More, illustrated by Nonny Hogrogian, won the 1966 Caldecott Medal.

Awards
 Lewis Carroll Shelf Award, 1962
 Newbery Honor, 1963
 Caldecott Medal, 1966

Works
Most of Leodhas' works are in collections.

 Heather and Broom: Tales of the Scottish Highlands (1960), illustrated by Consuelo Joerns
 Thistle and Thyme: Tales and Legends from Scotland (1962), illus. Evaline Ness
 All in the Morning Early (1963), illus. Evaline Ness
 Gaelic Ghosts: Tales of the Supernatural from Scotland (1964), illus. Nonny Hogrogian
 Ghosts Go Haunting (1965)
 Claymore and Kilt: Tales of Scottish Kings and Castles (1967), illus. Leo and Diane Dillon
 Sea-Spell and Moor-Magic: Tales of the Western Isles (1968), illus. Vera Bock
 By Loch and by Lin: Tales from Scottish Ballads (1969), illus. Vera Bock
 Twelve Great Black Cats and Other Eerie Scottish Tales (1971), illus. Vera Bock

Sources

External links

 
 
 Leclaire Alger at LC Authorities, with 5 records

1898 births
1969 deaths
American children's writers
American librarians
American women librarians
Newbery Honor winners
Writers from Youngstown, Ohio
20th-century American women writers
Pseudonymous women writers
20th-century pseudonymous writers